Englehart is a town in the Canadian province of Ontario.

Englehart may also refer to:

Locations 
 Englehart River, in Timiskaming District in northeastern Ontario, Canada
 Englehart railway station, in the town of Englehart in Ontario, Canada
 Englehart (Dave's Field) Aerodrome, adjacent to Englehart, Ontario, Canada

People 
 Bob Englehart (born 1945), editorial cartoonist for the Hartford Courant since December 15, 1980
 Harry Englehart, former Democrat member of the Pennsylvania House of Representatives
 Jacob Lewis Englehart (1847–1921), oil refiner and founder of Imperial Oil
 John Englehart or Joseph John Englehart (1867–1915), American landscape painter
 Steve Englehart (born 1947), American comic book writer
 Steve Englehart (American football) (born 1977), American football player and coach

See also
 Engleheart, a surname